Looney Tunes Golden Collection: Volume 4 is a DVD box set that was released by Warner Home Video on November 14, 2006. 

This Looney Tunes collection is the first one where every disc in the collection has a special theme. Disc one is Bugs Bunny. Disc two is devoted to cartoons directed by Frank Tashlin. Disc three is dedicated to Speedy Gonzales cartoons. Disc four features Sylvester, plus lesser known feline characters such as Conrad the Cat and Claude Cat, among others. Previous Golden Collections included at least one All-Stars disc with no common theme.

Like Volume 3, Volume 4 contains a warning about the politically incorrect humor and racial stereotypes in some of the cartoons, but unlike Volume 3's warning, which was a filmed introduction done by Whoopi Goldberg, Volume 4 simply presents a title card before the main menu with the following:

The Region 2 version contains only 53 shorts; 11 on Disc 2, and 14 on each of the others.

Related releases
Akin to Volume 2 and 3, Disc 1 was released separately in Region 4 as Best of Bugs Bunny, Volume 4, while the other discs were not released in the same format.

In Region 1, discs 1 and 4 were also released separately as the more family-friendly Looney Tunes Spotlight Collection: Volume 4.

Disc 1 - Bugs Bunny Favorites
All cartoons on this disc star Bugs Bunny.

Special features

Audio bonuses
 Audio commentaries
Eric Goldberg on Rabbit Hood and Mississippi Hare
Paul Dini on Operation: Rabbit and Hurdy-Gurdy Hare
Jerry Beck on 8 Ball Bunny
June Foray and Jerry Beck on Rabbit Romeo
 Music only tracks on Knight-mare Hare, Sahara Hare, Barbary Coast Bunny, To Hare Is Human and Rabbit Romeo
 Music and effects track on Operation: Rabbit and Southern Fried Rabbit

Behind the Tunes
 Twilight in Tunes: The Music of Raymond Scott
 Powerhouse in Pictures

From the Vault
 Bugs Bunny: Superstar, part 1 (1975), which contains the following shorts:
 What's Cookin' Doc? (1944)
 The Wild Hare (1940)
 A Corny Concerto (1943)
 I Taw a Putty Tat (1948)
Fifty Years of Bugs Bunny in 3 ½ Minutes - (1989)
 The Bugs Bunny Show
 Ballpoint Puns Bridging Sequences
 Foreign Legion Leghorn recording sessions
 Trailer Gallery:
 Bugs Bunny's Cartoon Carnival
 Bugs Bunny's All-Star Revue

Disc 2 - A Dash of Tashlin
All cartoons on this disc are directed by Frank Tashlin.

Special features

Audio commentaries
 Mark Kausler on The Case of the Stuttering Pig and Porky in the North Woods Michael Barrier with Frank Tashlin on Now That Summer is Gone, Cracked Ice and Porky's Poultry Plant Daniel Goldmark on You're an Education Greg Ford on Plane Daffy and I Got Plenty of Mutton Jerry Beck on Puss n' Booty Eddie Fitzgerald on The Stupid CupidFrom the Vault
 Bugs Bunny: Superstar, part 2, which contains the following shorts:
 Rhapsody Rabbit (1946)
 Walky Talky Hawky (1946)
 My Favorite Duck (1942)
 Hair-Raising Hare (1946)
 The Old Grey Hare (1944)
 Porky and Daffy in "The William Tell Overture" (1991)
 Frank Tashlin Storybooks
 Little Chic’s Wonderful Mother
 Tony and Clarence
Private Snafu shorts
 The Goldbrick (1943)
 The Home Front (1943)
 Censored (1944)

Disc 3 - Speedy Gonzales in a FlashAll cartoons on this disc star Speedy Gonzales.Special features

Audio bonuses
 Audio commentaries
Stan Freberg and Jerry Beck on Cat-Tails for TwoGreg Ford with Friz Freleng on Mexican BoardersArt Leonardi and Jerry Beck on Nuts and VoltsPaul Dini on The Wild Chase Music only track on Tabasco Road, Mexicali Schmoes, and West of the Pesos Music and effects track on Cat-Tails for TwoFrom the Vault
 90 Day Wondering (1956 Army reenlistment film by Chuck Jones)
 Drafty, Isn’t It? (1957 Army recruitment film by Chuck Jones)

OthersFriz on Film (new 1-hour documentary)

Disc 4 - Kitty Korner

Special features

Audio bonuses
 Audio commentaries
Greg Ford with Chuck Jones on Conrad the SailorEddie Fitzgerald on The Aristo-CatGreg Ford with Chuck Jones on The Aristo-CatJerry Beck on Dough Ray Me-owDaniel Goldmark on Pizzicato PussycatJune Foray and Jerry Beck on The Unexpected Pest Music only tracks on Cat Feud, The Unexpected Pest, and Go Fly a Kit Music and effects track on A Peck o' TroubleBehind the Tunes
 One Hit Wonders
 Sing-a-Song of Looney Tunes
 The Art of the Gag
 Wild Lines: The Art of Voice Acting
 Looney Tunes: A Cast of Thousands

From the Vault
 Porky’s Breakdowns'' (1939 joke reel with Porky swearing) (unavailable on UK release)
 Sahara Hare Storyboard Reel
 Porky’s Poor Fish Storyboard Reel

See also
 Looney Tunes and Merrie Melodies filmography
 Looney Tunes and Merrie Melodies filmography (1929–1939)
 Looney Tunes and Merrie Melodies filmography (1940–1949)
 Looney Tunes and Merrie Melodies filmography (1950–1959)
 Looney Tunes and Merrie Melodies filmography (1960–1969)
 Looney Tunes and Merrie Melodies filmography (1970–present and miscellaneous)
 List of Bugs Bunny cartoons

Notes

References

External links
 Bugs Bunny/Looney Tunes Comedy Hour, The - Complete List of Volume 4 Shorts at tvshowsondvd.com
 
 

Looney Tunes home video releases